Lady Cheonchujeon of the Gaeseong Wang clan, personal name Wang Aji was a Goryeo Royal Princess as the third child and oldest daughter of King Gwangjong and Queen Daemok who later married her first cousin, Prince Cheonchu.

References

Goryeo princesses
10th-century Korean people
Year of birth unknown
Year of death unknown